is a senior high school in Matsumoto, Nagano Prefecture, Japan. The school is located in Agata 2 Chome.

History
Matsumoto Agatagaoka High School was first opened as Nagano Prefectural Matsumoto No. 2 Junior High on 17, April, 1923. On 1, April, 1948 it was renamed Nagano Prefectural Matsumoto Agatagaoka High School. The school's name comes from its location in Agata.

The high school offers both a general course and an English course. In 1994, the English program was established. The general education course accepts 280 students per year while the English course accepts 40. There have been more than 27 thousand graduates since the founding of the school.

School symbols
The four points of the school symbol represent the Japanese Alps. It was designed by a high school staff member in 1923. The current design was revised in 1948.

School song
The school has had four songs. The music is by Kiyoshi Nobutoki, with lyrics by Tatsuyuki Takano.

Academics
About 140 to 150 students are accepted to national and public universities in Japan each year. Among them, about 50 are accepted to Shinshu University. There are successful applicants to Hokkaido University, Tohoku University, Nagoya University, and Osaka University every year. Students have also been accepted to Kyoto University and Tokyo University. About 150 students are accepted to private universities such as Waseda University, Keiou University, Jochi University, Meiji University, Rikkyo University, and Hosei University every year.

Students

Clubs
The school hosts a number of clubs, split between sports and cultural clubs. In 2015, sports clubs had a participation rate of 56.1% and the cultural clubs had a rate of 45.4%.

Sports clubs

Cultural clubs

School festival
During that time, students enjoy eating foods, listening to announcements from the cultural clubs, and participate in the relay.

Walking competition
The competition is held in October. Boys walk 32 kilometers while girls walk 28.

Notable alumni
Many famous people have graduated from Matsumoto Agatagaoka High School, including lawyers, university professors, athletes, singers, and actors. These include film director Takashi Yamazaki, who directed Always: Sunset on Third Street and Eternal Zero.

External links 
Matsumoto Agatagaoka High School

References 

Matsumoto, Nagano
Education in Nagano Prefecture
High schools in Nagano Prefecture